Tableau Software is an American interactive data visualization software company focused on business intelligence. It was founded in 2003 in Mountain View, California, and is currently headquartered in Seattle, Washington. In 2019 the company was acquired by Salesforce for $15.7 billion. At the time, this was the largest acquisition by Salesforce (a leader in the CRM field) since its foundation. It was later surpassed by Salesforce's acquisition of Slack.

The company's founders, Christian Chabot, Pat Hanrahan and Chris Stolte, were researchers at the Department of Computer Science at Stanford University. They specialized in visualization techniques for exploring and analyzing relational databases and data cubes, and started the company as a commercial outlet for research at Stanford from 1999 to 2002.

Tableau products query relational databases, online analytical processing cubes, cloud databases, and spreadsheets to generate graph-type data visualizations. The software can also extract, store, and retrieve data from an in-memory data engine.

Software products

Tableau products include:

 Tableau Desktop
 Tableau Server
 Tableau Prep Builder (released in 2018)
 Tableau Vizable (consumer data visualization mobile app released in 2015)
 Tableau Public (free to use)
 Tableau Reader (free to use)
 Tableau Mobile
 Tableau Cloud
 Tableau Prep
 Tableau CRM

Functionalities

Tableau offers drag and drop and other features such as multiple chart formats and mapping capabilities.

Map functionalities 
The software is able to plot latitude and longitude coordinates and connect to spatial files like Esri Shapefiles, KML, and GeoJSON to display custom geography. The built-in geo-coding allows for administrative places (country, state/province, county/district), postal codes, US Congressional Districts, US CBSA/MSA, Area Codes, Airports, and European Union statistical areas (NUTS codes) to be mapped automatically. Geographies can be grouped to create custom territories or custom geocoding used to extend existing geographic roles in the product.

Data sources 
Tableau Software can connect to data sources such as regular text files (.txt, .csv), Microsoft Excel (.xlsx), Microsoft Access (.accdb), import from Tableau workbook (.tbm) or Tableau Table data Extract (.tds).

Data Type

Tableau express automatically data types and fields. Tableau will make use of the data type that the data source has defined if it exits, or it will choose a data type if the data source does not specify one. In Tableau, the following data types are supported 

 Text Value

 Data Value
 Data and time Value
 Numerical Value
 Geographic Values (Latitude and longitude used for maps)
 Boolean Values (True / False Conditions)

History 

Tableau was founded in January 2003 by Pat Hanrahan, Christian Chabot, and Chris Stolte, and moved its headquarters to the Fremont neighborhood of Seattle, Washington, the following year. The company has since expanded its Fremont headquarters and announced plans in 2016 for an auxiliary campus in suburban Kirkland, Washington. A new headquarters building opened near Gas Works Park in Wallingford in March 2017 and was followed by a new building in Fremont that opened in 2018.

In August 2016, Tableau announced the appointment of Adam Selipsky as president and CEO, effective September 16, 2016, replacing co-founder Christian Chabot as CEO.

In June 2018, Tableau acquired Empirical Systems, a Cambridge, Massachusetts based artificial intelligence startup, with plans to integrate the company's technology into the Tableau platform. Tableau also announced plans to establish an office in Cambridge as a result of the deal.

On June 10, 2019, Tableau was acquired by Salesforce in an all-stock deal worth over $15 billion.

In March 2021, Tableau announced the appointment of Mark Nelson as president and CEO, replacing Adam Selipsky.

Notable Tableau employees include Deputy Assistant Secretary of Defense Phil Carter and computer scientist and author Leland Wilkinson.

Finances 
On May 17, 2013, Tableau launched an initial public offering on the New York Stock Exchange, raising more than $250 million. Prior to its IPO, Tableau raised over $45 million in venture capital investment from investors such as the NEA and Meritech.

The company's 2013 revenue reached $232.44 million, an 82% growth over 2012's $128 million. In 2010, Tableau reported revenue of $34.2 million. That figure grew to $62.4 million in 2011 and $127.7 million in 2012. Profit during the same periods came to $2.7 million, $3.4 million, and $1.6 million, respectively.

Community  

Tableau has an extensive community of developers who have created over 2 million public visualizations. Tableau hosts a visualization contest annually called Iron Viz, modeled after Iron Chef. The winners of the qualifier round of Iron Viz compete live on-stage at Tableau's annual conference.

Wikileaks and policy changes 
On December 2, 2010, Tableau deleted WikiLeaks' visualizations about the United States diplomatic cables leak, stating it was due to direct political pressure from US Senator Joe Lieberman.

On February 21, 2011, Tableau posted an updated data policy. The accompanying blog post cited the two main changes as (1) creating a formal complaint process and (2) using freedom of speech as a guiding principle. In addition, the post announced the creation of an advisory board to help the company navigate future situations that "push the boundaries" of the policy. Tableau likened the new policy to the model set forth in the Digital Millennium Copyright Act, and opined that under the new policy, Wikileaks' visuals would not have been removed, as "the underlying data were statistics about the cables, not the cables themselves".

Awards 
In 2008, Tableau was named a Codie award winner for "Best Business Intelligence Solution" by the Software and Information Industry Association.

The company was recognized as a leader in the Gartner Magic Quadrant for ten consecutive years between 2013 and 2022.

References

External links 
 
 https://www.tableau.com/support/case

Salesforce
Companies formerly listed on the New York Stock Exchange
Data visualization software
Business software companies
Data analysis software
Business intelligence companies
Software companies based in Seattle
Data companies
2013 initial public offerings
American companies established in 2003
Software companies established in 2003
2003 establishments in California
2019 mergers and acquisitions
Software companies of the United States
Wallingford, Seattle